The Charles Ilfeld Memorial Chapel, located in the Masonic Cemetery at Colonias & Romero in Las Vegas, New Mexico, was built in 1912.  It was listed on the National Register of Historic Places in 1985.

The building serves as a chapel and as home for the Masonic Cemetery's caretaker.  It is an L-shaped Tudor Revival-style building with buttresses at ends and midway.  It is constructed of rusticated random ashlar sandstone, light brown in color, with reddish mortar.  It has a dark brown wood shingle roof, half-timbering in its gable, bargeboards, and exposed rafters.

It was deemed significant as "one of the most richly finished Tudor Revival buildings in New Mexico".  It was funded in 1912 by Charles Ilfeld "the State's leading nineteenth-century merchant", who later would fund completion of the larger Adele Ilfeld Auditorium.

References

See also
Adele Ilfeld Auditorium, also NRHP-listed in Las Vegas, New Mexico

National Register of Historic Places in San Miguel County, New Mexico
Tudor Revival architecture in the United States
Buildings and structures completed in 1912